Adult Behavior is a 1999 Swedish comedy film directed by Felix Herngren and Fredrik Lindström.

Cast 
 Felix Herngren - Frank Philgren
  - Nenne Philgren
 Cecilia Ljung - Rosie
 Mikael Persbrandt - Georg
 Källa Bie - Sofia
 Fredrik Lindström - Markus
 Alvin Nyström - Robin
 Magnus Härenstam - Frank's boss

References

External links 

1999 comedy films
1999 films
Swedish comedy films
1990s Swedish films